Aniekan Udofia (born 1976) is a portrait artist known for his large-scale paintings and murals in the Washington, D.C. area. His art work familiar to the community of northwest D.C, came to prominence after a mural tribute to American icon Duke Ellington. Udofia garnered national attention with his caricatures and photorealistic illustrations for publications such as XXL, Vibe, DC Pulse, and The Source.

Udofia other famous works were the huge murals of Fredrick Douglass and George Washington. He is also well-known from his solo and group live paintings at various Washington events, which are sponsored by companies like Red Bull, Heineken, Honda, Current TV, Timberland including and Adidas. In December 2011, Udofia and his works headlined a Visual Collaborative pop-up exhibition called Visual Grandeur. Udofia became a household name in the visual hip-hop scene by designing sports wear for companies like AND1 and Native Tongue.

The Village B-Boy
Udofia's ‘’The Village B-Boy‘’ was a trademark exhibition. It was a collection of over 20 images. The images reflect the vitality and exuberance of the biggest musical export into the United States after jazz. Udofia demonstrated the takeover of the Western pop culture by Africa in this collection, using graphite, paint markers, acrylic, spray paint and stencils.

References 

1976 births
Living people
American people of Nigerian descent
Nigerian artists
Contemporary painters